Aberdeen F.C. competed in Scottish Football League Division One and the Scottish Cup in season 1907–1908.

Overview
This was Aberdeen's fifth season and their third in the top flight of Scottish football. Aberdeen improved on their league finish from the previous season, finishing eighth place out of 18 clubs. They also had their best season to date in the Scottish Cup, going all the way to the semi-final but losing 0–1 to Celtic. Notable new signings included Donald Colman from Motherwell. In this season, Willie Lennie became the first Aberdeen player to be capped for Scotland when he played against Wales in March 1908.

Results

Scottish Division One

Final standings

Scottish Cup

Squad

Appearances & Goals

|}

References

Notes

Aberdeen F.C. seasons
Aberdeen